Saxifraga aizoides, yellow mountain saxifrage or yellow saxifrage, is a flowering alpine plant of the genus Saxifraga.

Description
It spreads by short rhizomes, forming mats of small colonies.

The flowers, with five sepals and petals, are yellow—green.

Distribution
It prefers cold and moist well-draining neutral to basic bedrock, gravel, sand, or shale cliff environments. It is found in: North America, including Alaska, across Canada, the Great Lakes region, and Greenland; and in Europe, including the Tatra Mountains, Alps, and Svalbard.

It is a listed threatened species in New York state.

References

External links
Topwalks: Saxifraga aizoides
Saxifraga aizoides — U.C. Photo gallery

aizoides
Alpine flora
Flora of Europe
Flora of Greenland
Flora of North America
Threatened flora of the United States
Plants described in 1753
Taxa named by Carl Linnaeus
Flora of the Alps
Flora of the Carpathians